John Russell (22 April 1885 - 6 March 1956) was an American writer and screenwriter.

Biography
Born in Davenport, Iowa, in 1885, Russell wrote for the New York City News Association news agency, and then for the New York Tribune. The Pagan was based on one of his stories, and he wrote the screenplay for Beau Geste.

As author he was best known for his short stories, originally written for a wide range of magazines and newspapers, and then collected in books. He also wrote The Society Wolf, published in 1910, which was written under the pen name Luke Thrice. Other pseudonyms include Edward Rutledge, Andrew Peirce, George Jerry Osborn and Matthew Primus.

Russell died in Santa Monica, California in 1956.

Books
 The Society Wolf writing as Luke Thrice,  illustrated by W. H. Loomis and Modest Stein. New York, Cupples & Leon, 1910.
 The Red Mark and Other Stories, Alfred A. Knopf, 1919
 Where the Pavement Ends, Alfred A. Knopf, 1921 (new edition of The Red Mark now using the title from the U. K. edition)
 In Dark Places, Alfred A. Knopf, 1923
 Far Wandering Men, W. W. Norton, 1929
 Cops 'N Robbers, W. W. Norton, 1930

Partial filmography

 Where the Pavement Ends (1923)
 The Exiles (1923)
 Mademoiselle Midnight (1924)
 The Iron Horse (1924)
 Dangerous Money (1924)
 Argentine Love (1924)
 The Little French Girl (1925)
 The Crowded Hour (1925)
 The Street of Forgotten Men (1925)
 Lord Jim (1925)
 Beau Geste (1926)
 The Sorrows of Satan (1926)
 God Gave Me Twenty Cents (1926)
 The Red Mark (1928)
 The Pagan (1929)
 Side Street (1929)
 Girl of the Port (1930)
 The Sea God (1930)
 Frankenstein (1931)

References

External links
 
 
 
 N C Wyeth, Howard Pyle, Luke Thrice and the Seamless Web

1885 births
1956 deaths
Writers from Davenport, Iowa
Screenwriters from Iowa
American male screenwriters
20th-century American male writers
20th-century American screenwriters
20th-century American short story writers
New-York Tribune personnel